10–11 Saturday Market Place is an historic building in Saturday Market Place, the main market square in King's Lynn, Norfolk, England. It stands opposite the northern side of King's Lynn Minster, while King's Lynn Town Hall is attached to its western end.

Originally a house, built in the 17th century, it has since been various restaurants. It is built of brick which has been rendered and colour-washed. It has a plain-tiled roof, with a central panelled main door, with a secondary one to the right. Between these two doors is a plate-glass sash window, dating to the late 19th century. Two more, modern, windows are located to the left of the main door.

The first floor has two late-19th-century sash windows.

The building, which has a gabled roof, was altered in the 20th century.

Occupants 
In the mid-20th-century, the home was converted to a restaurant named The Charter House.

Between 1991 and 2001, it was Rococo, a fine-dining restaurant owned by Nick Anderson. Anderson closed the restaurant in 2001, before moving to Wells, Somerset, but returned in 2005. Rococo (renamed Maggie's in 2006) closed in 2007.

The building was occupied between 2010 and 2020 by Market Bistro.

See also 

 List of buildings in King's Lynn

References 

17th-century establishments in England
Saturday Market Place 10-11
Grade II listed buildings in Norfolk